Heliophanus termitophagus is a jumping spider species in the genus Heliophanus.  It was first described in 2002 and lives in South Africa.

References

Endemic fauna of South Africa
Salticidae
Spiders described in 2009
Spiders of South Africa